Panhandle High School is a public high school located in the city of Panhandle, Texas in Carson County, United States and classified as a 2A school by the UIL. It is a part of the Panhandle Independent School District located in central Carson County. In 2015, the school was rated "Met Standard" by the Texas Education Agency.

Athletics
The Panhandle Panthers compete in these sports - 

Basketball
Cross Country
Football
Golf
Powerlifting
Tennis
Track and Field

State Titles
Girls Basketball  
1992(2A)
2016(2A)
2017(2A)
Boys Track 
1984(2A)

References

External links
Panhandle ISD website

Public high schools in Texas
Schools in Carson County, Texas